"Shakespeare's (Way with) Words" is a song by Popstars: The Rivals male winners One True Voice, released on 2 June 2003. The song was the second and final release by the band, as they split up in August 2003 without having released an album. The song reached number 10 on the UK Singles Chart and number 39 in Ireland.

Track listings
UK CD1
 "Shakespeare's (Way with) Words" (radio edit)
 "(In My Own) Simple Way"
 "Shakespeare's (Way with) Words" (WIP 12-inch mix)
 "Shakespeare's (Way with) Words" (video)

UK CD2
 "Shakespeare's (Way with) Words" (radio edit)
 "Sacred Trust" (WIP 12-inch mix)
 Behind the scenes at the video shoot

UK cassette single
 "Shakespeare's (Way with) Words" (radio edit)
 "(In My Own) Simple Way"
 "Shakespeare's (Way with) Words" (WIP 12-inch mix)

Charts

References

2003 songs
2003 singles
Jive Records singles
Pete Waterman Entertainment singles
Popstars
Songs written by Rick Astley